Spelga Reservoir is a reservoir in the townland of Spelga in the Mourne Mountains of County Down, Northern Ireland. It has a volume of 2,700,000 cubic metres and a catchment area of 5.423 km². It occupies an area known as Deers Meadow, and impounds the River Bann, which rises on the nearby Slieve Muck.

Construction

The reservoir and dam were built as part of a project that had origins in the idea of supplying water to Belfast, in 1894. The Spelga Reservoir itself was developed between 1953 and 1957. As part of the construction, the B27 road was rebuilt above the reservoir to replace the original road submerged by the construction. The Dam was designed by the Belfast engineering firm of R. Ferguson and S. McIlveen and construction was undertaken by John Laing & Sons.

Prior to the construction of the reservoir, archaeological excavation was carried out and three groups of transhumant buildings, or booley huts,  were identified. Some of the structures were dated to the eighteenth century, but it is thought that the site had been used since pre-historic times due to the presence of flint flakes.

Use
The Portadown and Banbridge areas receive their water supply from the reservoir. Whilst it has not been stocked with fish for some years, it is home to wild pike and  trout.
In 2018 and again in 2020, heatwaves and dry weather caused the water level to drop. This exposed a portion of the original road through the Deers Meadow, including a bridge which was formerly the first bridge on the River Bann.

References

Sources

External links
 Robert's Photo Gallery
 BFI archive film of the dam's construction

Northern Ireland coast and countryside
Reservoirs in County Down
Tourist attractions in County Down